Cecelia Cortes (born June 12, 1989 in Cambridge) is a professional squash player who represents the United States. She reached a career high ranking of World No. 62 in December 2014.

References

External links 

American female squash players
Living people
1989 births
21st-century American women